The Paralympic Committee of Serbia ( / Paraolimpijski komitet Srbije) is the National Paralympic Committee in Serbia for the Paralympic Games movement. It is a non-profit organisation that selects teams, and raises funds to send Serbian competitors to Paralympic events organised by the International Paralympic Committee (IPC).

See also
Serbia at the Paralympics

References

External links
Official website

National Paralympic Committees
Paralympic
Serbia at the Paralympics
Sports organizations established in 2006
2006 establishments in Serbia
Organizations based in Belgrade